Demron is a radiation-shielding fabric. Weight-for-weight the material has slightly lower radiation protection than lead shielding, but it is flexible. The composition of Demron is proprietary information, but it has 
been described as a non-toxic polyethylene and Non-PVC-based polymer fused between two layers of a woven fabric. The polymer molecule mimics some of the electronic properties of the heavy metals usually used as radiation shielding, and has a large electron cloud so that incoming radiation will deflect or be absorbed by it. It is roughly three to four times more expensive than a conventional lead apron, but can be treated like a normal fabric for cleaning, storage and disposal.  More recent uses for Demron include certified first responder hazmat suits as well as tactical vests.

See also 
Nuclear safety

References

External links 
Radiation Shield Technologies
United States Patent Application

Technical fabrics